Norway qualified for one UEFA European Championship so far (as of 2020), the Euro 2000 tournament. During the qualifiers, they enforced direct qualification by ending first in their group with Slovenia, Greece, Latvia, Albania and Georgia.

At the championship in Belgium and the Netherlands, Norway was drawn into group C together with Spain, Yugoslavia and Slovenia. With their last group match against Slovenia ending on 0–0 and the simultaneously played other group match Yugoslavia vs. Spain standing 3–2 after the regular playing time, it appeared Norway (with 4 points) would finish second in their group, ahead of Spain (3 points). However, after an unlikely 3–4 comeback from Spain during the extra time Norway saw themselves eliminated. Norway coach Nils Johan Semb worded this as his team having been "at 12 seconds from the quarter-finals".

Euro 2000

Group stage

Overall record

Player records

Most appearances

Goalscorers

References

 
Countries at the UEFA European Championship